Judit Halász (born 7 October 1942) is a Hungarian actress and singer. She has appeared in more than sixty films since 1962.

She is  known for her albums of Hungarian children's music.

Selected filmography

References

External links 

1942 births
Living people
Hungarian film actresses